JDS Makishio (SS-567) was the second boat of thes. She was commissioned on 2 February 1972.

Construction and career 
Makishio was laid down at Mitsubishi Heavy Industries Kobe Shipyard on 21 June 1969 and launched on 27 January 1971. She was commissioned on 2 February 1972, into the 1st Submarine Group together on the same day with JDS Uzushio.

On 16 October 1973 , the 4th Submarine was reorganized into the 2nd Submarine Group, which was newly formed under the Self-Defense Fleet.

Participated in Hawaii dispatch training from 22 September to 14 December 1977.

Participated in Hawaii dispatch training from 12 September to 12 December 1980.

She was decommissioned on 11 March 1988 and dismantled by Hisaya Sangyo in Kitakyushu City in April 1994.

Citations 

1971 ships
Uzushio-class submarines
Ships built by Mitsubishi Heavy Industries